OneLogin, Inc. is a cloud-based identity and access management (IAM) provider that develops a unified access management (UAM) platform to enterprise-level businesses and organizations. It was founded in 2009 by brothers Thomas Pedersen and Christian Pedersen.

History
OneLogin was founded in 2009 in San Francisco by Thomas and Christian Pedersen. The brothers were previously involved with the help desk application Zendesk, before launching OneLogin. The service officially launched in 2010. 

In December 2015, the company acquired San Diego-based Cafésoft, a provider of on-premise Web Access Management (WAM) software. The company provided on-premises Single Sign-On (SSO) applications.  In June 2016, OneLogin acquired a cloud-based password management tool known as Portadi. Later, in November 2016, OneLogin acquired a software vendor with container technology that runs on mobile devices, as well as an account takeover detection company in 2017. 

In 2019, OneLogin made several significant hires to its executive leadership team including appointing Rick Barr as Chief Operating Officer, Dayna Rothman as Chief Marketing Officer, and Vanessa Pegueros as Chief Trust & Security Officer.

OneLogin was acquired on October 4, 2021, by One Identity.

Awards
 May 2015: Forrester Research ranked OneLogin as the top vendor in the Forrester Wave for Cloud Identity & Access Management.
 March 2016: OneLogin was named among the "Fast 50" privately held Internet security, networking, and storage companies by JMP Securities LLC.
 April 2016: OneLogin named one of Fortune's Top 25 Workplaces in the Bay Area  SMB.
April 2017: Fortune's Top 25 Workplaces in the Bay Area  SMB.
 August 2019: OneLogin's Brad Brooks was recognized as a Top-50 SaaS CEO.
 November 2019: Gartner Peer Insights Customers' Choice for Access Management 2019.
 March 2020: Cyber Defense Magazine's InfoSec Awards 2020 for Most Innovative Trusted Experience Platform️.
 October 2020: OneLogin wins "Remote Work Security Innovation of the Year" designation in the 2020 RemoteTech Breakthrough Awards Program.
 November 2020: OneLogin was recognized as a Leader in Gartner's Magic Quadrant for Access Management.
August 2021: OneLogin was recognized as a Leader in The Forrester Wave: Identity As A Service (IDaaS) For Enterprise, Q3 2021.

Security
In August 2016, OneLogin reported that "an unauthorized user gained access to one of our standalone systems, which we use for log storage and analytics." The single user accessed the service for a month or more and may have been able to see Secure Notes unencrypted. In response, OneLogin fixed the cleartext logging bug, locked down access to the log management system, and reset passwords.

On May 31, 2017, OneLogin detected and stopped unauthorized access in their US data region. As OneLogin reported, "a threat actor used one of our AWS keys to gain access to our AWS platform via an API from an intermediate host with another, smaller service provider in the US."

See also

List of single sign-on implementations

References

External links

Federated identity
Identity management systems
Cloud applications
Access control software
Password authentication
Computer security companies
Software companies based in the San Francisco Bay Area
Active Directory
Computer security software companies
Computer security software
Computer access control
Companies based in San Francisco
Software companies of the United States